Ghangad is a fort situated near 30km from Lonavla-Khandala and 100 km from Pune in Maharashtra state, India.This fort is an important fort in the Pune district. The fort restoration is done by the Shivaji Trail group with the help of local villagers. The fort is at least 300 years old. Restoration work took place in 2011-12.

History
Very less information is available about the history of the fort. This fort was used for keeping prisoners and for keeping watch on the trade route from Pune to Konkan. Until 1818 this fort was under the Maratha empire. This fort was surrendered to British forces after the fall of Korigad on 17-March-1818.

How to reach
The fort can be reached by road via Tamhini ghat road or via Lonavla. The nearest town is Lonavla which is 30km from the base village of the fort i.e. Ekole.  There are good hotels at Lonavla, now tea and snacks are also available in small hotels on the way at Peth Shahapur. The road becomes rugged in the Saltar pass. The trekking path starts from the hillock south of the Ekole village. The route is very safe and wide. There is a dense forest on the trekking route. It takes about half an hour to reach the entrance gate of the fort. The night stay on the fort can be made on the flat ground near the entrance or GarjaiDevi temple on the way to Fort. This fort is approachable in all seasons. The villagers from the Ekole make night stay and food arrangements at reasonable rates.

Places to see
There are two gates on the fort. The main entrance gate has the arch missing. The villagers have placed an iron ladder to climb to the Balekilla of the fort. There is a rock cut water cistern on the way to the second gate. The water is available round the year for drinking purpose. It takes about an hour to visit all places on the fort. There are remains of few dilapidated building on the Balekilla. The top of the bale killa gives a scenic view of the TailBaila, Korigad, Mulshi dam and Sudhagad fort

Gallery

See also 
 List of forts in Maharashtra
 List of forts in India
 Baji Prabhu Deshpande
 Marathi People
 Maratha Navy
 List of Maratha dynasties and states
 Maratha War of Independence
 Battles involving the Maratha Empire
 Maratha Army
 Maratha titles
 Military history of India
 List of people involved in the Maratha Empire

References 

Buildings and structures of the Maratha Empire
Forts in Pune district
16th-century forts in India
Forts in Maharashtra